The 2015 Giro del Trentino was the 39th edition of the Giro del Trentino cycling stage race. The official name of the race was Giro del Trentino-Melinda, as the former one-day race Trofeo Melinda merged with the Giro del Trentino due to financial issues. For this reason, the last stage of Giro del Trentino passed through Val di Sole and the Non Valley, on the traditional route of the Trofeo Melinda. The race started on 21 April in Riva del Garda and ended on 24 April in Cles. The race consisted of four stages; as in recent years, the first was a team time trial from Riva del Garda to Arco. The race was part of the 2015 UCI Europe Tour, and was rated as a 2.HC event.

The race was won by 's Australian rider Richie Porte, who took the leader's jersey after winning the second stage. Colombian Rodolfo Torres of  claimed the Mountains classification, Cesare Benedetti won the sprints classification, and 's Louis Meintjes, from South Africa, finished first in the young rider classification just as he did in 2014.  won the teams classification.

Schedule

Teams
16 teams were selected to take part in the 2015 Giro del Trentino. Four of these were UCI WorldTeams, ten were UCI Professional Continental teams, with the remaining two teams being UCI Continental team  and an Italian national team.

Stages

Stage 1
21 April 2015 — Riva del Garda to Arco, team time trial (TTT)

Stage 2
22 April 2015 — Dro to Brentonico (Parco del Baldo),

Stage 3
23 April 2015 — Ala to Fierozzo Val dei Mòcheni,

Stage 4
24 April 2015 — Malé to Cles,

Classification leadership table

Final standings

General classification

Mountains classification

Sprints classification

Young rider classification

References

External links

Tour of the Alps
Giro del Trentino
Giro del Trentino